T12 may refer to:

Aerospace 
 T12 (satellite), part of the DirecTV satellite fleet
 Slingsby T.12 Gull, a British glider
 Soyuz T-12, a crewed spaceflight
 Sukhoi T-12 Shturmovik-90, a proposed Russian fighter aircraft

Anatomy and medicine 
 Bacteriophage T12, responsible for scarlet fever
 Thoracic spinal nerve 12
 Twelfth thoracic vertebra

Automobiles 
 Cooper T12, a racing car
 Dallara T12, a racing car
 Isotta Fraschini T12, a concept car

Rail and transit

Lines 
 Île-de-France tramway Line 12 Express

Locomotives 
 Prussian T 12, a steam locomotive

Stations 
 Gokiso Station, Nagoya, Aichi Prefecture, Japan
 Higashi-Sapporo Station, Sapporo, Hokkaido, Japan
 Kyoto Shiyakusho-mae Station, Kyoto, Japan
 Monzen-Nakachō Station, Tokyo, Japan
 Moriguchi Station (Osaka), Japan
 Sambommatsu Station (Kagawa), Japan

Weapons and armor 
 100 mm anti-tank gun T-12, a Soviet anti-tank gun
 T-12 Cloudmaker, an earthquake bomb
 T-12 sniper rifle, a Turkish rifle
 T-12 tank, a Soviet prototype tank

Other uses 
 T12 (classification), a disability sport classification
 Circular Head language
 Estonian national road 12
 
 , a trawler of the Royal Navy
 T12 lamp, a fluorescent lamp format